Andreas Appelgren (born July 23, 1967) is a Swedish ice hockey coach. He is currently the head coach for Leksands IF of the Swedish Hockey League (SHL).

Appelgren joined the Leksands IF organization with the 2011–12 season as an assistant coach, and was promoted to head coach when he replaced Christer Olsson mid-season.

References

External links
Andreas Appelgren's profile at Eliteprospects.com

1967 births
Living people
Swedish ice hockey coaches